Glenn is an unincorporated community in Glenn County, California. It lies at an elevation of 98 feet (30 m). The town is located on the Sacramento River, at the intersection of State Route 45 and State Route 162. It is about ten miles (16 km) east of Interstate 5 and Willows on the U.S. Geological Survey 7.5-minute quadrangle, Glenn, California. The ZIP Code, shared with Ordbend and Bayliss, is 95943. The community is inside area code 530. This area is flagged as rural by the U.S. Census Bureau.

History
The first post office at Glenn opened in 1903. A. K. Barham owned and operated the Glenn Store and on November 14, 1913, was appointed postmaster. At that time, the post office was located in the store. The town had a church, school, several homes and a saloon. Barham's father was a foreman on one of the wheat ranches of Dr. Hugh J. Glenn in Glenn County.

Terrain and local landmarks
The area is relatively flat land along the banks of the Sacramento River. A local landmark is the Glenn Post Office on SR45 just north of SR162. Farther north still along SR45 is the local Mennonite Church as there is a modest population of Mennonite farming families in this area. Much of the area is agricultural land under cultivation. West of town, there is a natural gas well field along SR162 between Glenn and Willows.

Politics

Sources
 U.S. Geological Survey, National Geographic Names Database.
 Map: U.S. Geological Survey, Glenn, California, 7.5-minute Quadrangle, 1969.
 Map: Road Map of California: 1958, (Sacramento, California: Department of Public Works; Division of Highways, 1958).
 Map: State of California, Division of Oil, Gas, and Geothermal Resources, District 6, Map 620.

References

External links
Gas and oil well map of area.

Unincorporated communities in California
Unincorporated communities in Glenn County, California